Edward McCallum Morrison (22 February 1948 – 30 May 2011) was a Scottish footballer and manager. Morrison was born in Gourock, and spent the majority of his playing career as a striker at Kilmarnock, where he scored 149 goals in 341 appearances in all competitions. He has been described as a club 'legend'. As of April 2019, Morrison is the club's joint-second league goalscorer of all time, level with Kris Boyd on 121 goals.

Morrison also had a short spell at Morton after leaving Kilmarnock, and later joined the Greenock club's coaching staff. In 1985, he returned to Rugby Park and spent four years as Kilmarnock manager, Killie remaining in the First Division (second tier) throughout.

Morrison died on 30 May 2011, on the flight home from a holiday in Turkey.

References

1948 births
2011 deaths
Scottish footballers
Scottish football managers
Kilmarnock F.C. players
Greenock Morton F.C. players
Kilmarnock F.C. managers
Scottish Football League managers
Scottish Football League players
People from Gourock
Association football forwards
Scottish Junior Football Association players
Port Glasgow F.C. players
Footballers from Inverclyde